is a Japanese former Nippon Professional Baseball pitcher.

References 

1977 births
Living people
Baseball people from Kanagawa Prefecture 
Japanese baseball players
Nippon Professional Baseball pitchers
Yokohama BayStars players
Hokkaido Nippon-Ham Fighters players